Caffi is an Italian surname. Notable people with the surname include:

Alex Caffi, Italian former Formula One driver
Ippolito Caffi, Italian architectural painter
Margherita Caffi, Italian still life painter
Pedro Pablo García Caffi, Argentine singer and cultural administrator

See also
Museo di Scienze Naturali Enrico Caffi, natural history museum in Bergamo

Italian-language surnames